The Sun Odyssey 32.1 is a French sailboat that was designed by Philippe Briand as a cruiser and first built in 1994.

The design is sometimes confused withe the later 2004 Sun Odyssey 32.

Production
The design was built by Jeanneau in France, from 1994 to 1998, with 60 boats completed, but it is now out of production.

Design
The Sun Odyssey 32.1 is a recreational keelboat, built predominantly of fiberglass, with a balsa-cored deck and with wooden trim. The boat interior has varnished teak decor with a teak and holly cabin sole.

It has a fractional sloop rig, a nearly plumb stem, a reverse transom with a swimming platform, an internally mounted spade-type rudder controlled by a wheel and a fixed fin keel or optional shoal-draft keel. It displaces  and carries  of iron ballast.

See also
List of sailing boat types

References

External links

Photo of a Sun Odyssey 32.1 flying a spinnaker

Keelboats
1990s sailboat type designs
Sailing yachts
Sailboat type designs by Philippe Briand
Sailboat types built by Jeanneau